Celebrity Big Brother 2014 may refer to:

 Celebrity Big Brother 13
 Celebrity Big Brother 14